Woman of the Port is a 1991 Mexican drama film directed by Arturo Ripstein. It was screened in the Un Certain Regard section at the 1991 Cannes Film Festival.

Cast
 Damián Alcázar as Marro
 Alejandro Parodi as Carmelo
 Juan Pastor as Simón
 Patricia Reyes Spíndola as Tomasa
 Evangelina Sosa as Perla
 Ernesto Yáñez as Eneas

References

External links

1991 films
1991 drama films
1990s Spanish-language films
Films based on works by Guy de Maupassant
Films directed by Arturo Ripstein
Mexican drama films
1990s Mexican films